Elections to the Nevada Assembly were held on November 8, 2022. Elections were also be held in the state for U.S. Senate, U.S. House of Representatives, and for the Nevada Senate. 

Despite Republicans winning 56% of the popular vote among all State Assembly Districts, the party only won 14 of 42 seats. The discrepancy is explained by Democrats' not fielding a candidate in 7 safely Republican seats, lower turnout in Democratic-won districts, and Democratic gerrymandering. Democrats won 83% of Assembly districts in Clark County, Nevada with only 52% of the popular vote in the county.

Primary elections were held on June 14, 2022.

Predictions

Results

Overview

Close races
Seats where the margin of victory was under 10%:

See also 
 2022 Nevada elections

References

Assembly
Nevada Assembly
Nevada State Assembly elections